The SNCF Class BB 9300 was a class of French 1500V DC electric locomotives built by Schneider-Jeumont/CEM between 1967 and 1969. They were later mainly used on passenger services around Marseille, Avignon, Nîmes, Narbonne and Toulouse, and all had been withdrawn by 2014.

Description 

Technically, the class was closely derived from BB 9200. They were fitted with one-legged type AM18B pantographs unlike the BB 9200s, which were fitted with diamond type G pantographs. Differences between the two classes were notable at the bogie level, in particular the suspension system. Only the last BB 9200s were equipped with rheostatic braking, while all BB 9300s were equipped with it. The louvres were longer than on the BB 9200. The driver’s cab benefited from new ergonomics and the standardised controls fitted to most locomotives built from 1965.

Operational use 

When first delivered, they were assigned to lines in the South-East region, to provide traction for the Rapid and Express trains. From 1967 to 1970, some locomotives were rostered to haul the prestigious TEE Mistral before the advent of the more powerful CC 6500. BB 9319 to 9331 were fitted with special hydrostatic compensated buffers between 1975 and 1981, necessary for hauling the Talgo III-RD trainsets of Renfe on the two services using this stock: TEE Catalan-Talgo Geneva - Barcelona, from Geneva to Narbonne where diesel traction took over, during the period when this train was routed via Lyon-Brotteaux instead of Grenoble; and the Barcelona-Talgo sleeper train, linking Paris and Barcelona, from Paris-Austerlitz to Toulouse, where it was again handed over to diesel traction.

In 1977, the arrival of the new BB 7200s at the Villeneuve depot for service on the Paris-Lyon-Marseille artery displaced the less powerful BB 9300s. They were then progressively transferred to the Toulouse depot. By 1981, the entire class was allocated to Toulouse to operate express and mainline trains between Paris and Toulouse or Bordeaux, and on the cross-country lines of the South-West, as well as a few freight or postal trains.

At the end of the 2000s, the BB 9300s, like their BB 9200 cousins, experienced a sharp drop in activity due to the appearance of new regional multiple units. Some were stored out of use, the others remained in operation on the Teoz connections, then CIC and TER services, still around Toulouse and Bordeaux. They were regularly used to move empty coaching stock between Bordeaux and Juvisy.

Depot allocations 
The Villeneuve depot received all 40 locomotives of the class as soon as they were delivered, from 1967 to 1969. From 1977, they were gradually transferred to the Toulouse depot. By 1981 they were all at Toulouse and would remain so until the end of their career.

Fleet list 
The last members of the class were withdrawn on 2 September 2014

Accidents and incidents 
 BB 9302 was eventually written off following a collision on a level crossing, which occurred on 21 September 1990 at Chéry-Lury
 BB 9305 appeared in the film Ceux qui m'aiment prendront le train. (Those who love me will take the train).

Preservation 
 BB 9301: Preserved since September 2014 by the Cité du train, in Mulhouse.
 BB 9337: Preserved since 2011 in the annex of the Cité du train in Mohon.

References

Bibliography 

09300
Schneider locomotives
CEM locomotives
Bo′Bo′ locomotives
1500 V DC locomotives
Standard gauge electric locomotives of France
Railway locomotives introduced in 1967
Passenger locomotives